The SafetyNet API consists of several application programming interfaces (APIs) offered by the Google Play Services to support security sensitive applications, such as DRM. Currently, these APIs include device integrity verification, app verification, recaptcha and web address verification.

Attestation 

The SafetyNet Attestation API, one of the APIs under the SafetyNet umbrella, provides verification that the integrity of the device is not compromised.
In practice, non-official ROMs such as LineageOS fail the hardware attestation and thus restrict the user from enjoying a pure Android implementation (without the Google Services) while being able to use third-party apps (mainly banking).
Due to this, some consider this a monopolistic practice deterring the entrance of competing mobile operating systems in the market. 

The SafetyNet Attestation API (one of the four APIs under the SafetyNet umbrella) has been deprecated and will be replaced by the Play Integrity API soon. Like the SafetyNet APIs, the Play Integrity API is offered by Google Services and thus is not available on free Android environments (AOSP). Therefore, apps that require the API to be available may refuse to execute on AOSP builds.

References

External links 
 Protect against security threats with SafetyNet
 How does Universal SafetyNet Fix work?
 SafetyNet Attestation API deprecation timeline
 Play Integrity API Documentation
 Play Integrity API Migration Guide

Android (operating system)
Computer security